
Lac Lioson is a lake in the municipality of Ormont-Dessous, near Les Mosses, in the canton of Vaud, Switzerland.

The lake is used for fishing and ice diving.

See also 
 List of mountain lakes of Switzerland
 Lac de l'Hongrin

External links
 Lac de Lioson diving photos

Lakes of Switzerland
Lakes of the canton of Vaud
LLacLioson